Kevin Thomas Boyd (born 23 June 1966) is an English former competitive swimmer who represented Great Britain in the Olympics and World University Games, and England in the Commonwealth Games, during the 1980s.  He competed internationally in freestyle swimming events.

Swimming career
Boyd attended Hymers College in Hull and, along with elder brother Steven, joined the local swimming club Hull Olympic in 1972.  He soon became a proficient swimmer at local and county level in backstroke events, before switching to freestyle in his teens. He joined the Borough of South Tyneside swimming club in 1984 after beginning his degree in medicine at Newcastle University.

He competed in the 400-metre freestyle and the 1500-metre freestyle at the 1988 Summer Olympics in Seoul, South Korea, finishing 7th in both finals.  He was a member of the British men's squad that competed in the qualifying heats of the 4×200-metre freestyle relay. In the 1988 Guinness Book of Records he appeared as holding the world record for the 400, 800 and 1500 metres freestyle.

He represented England and won a silver medal in the 400 metres freestyle and a bronze medal in the 4 x 100 metres freestyle relay, at the 1986 Commonwealth Games in Edinburgh, Scotland. Four years later he represented England in the freestyle events, at the 1990 Commonwealth Games in Auckland, New Zealand. He also won the 1986 and 1987 ASA National Championship title in the 400 metres freestyle and the 1987 and 1989 ASA British National 1500 metres freestyle titles.

Personal life
Boyd gave up swimming in 1991 and now works as an orthopaedics specialist and a clinical teacher at University Hospitals Leicester. He is married, and has a daughter and a son.

See also
 List of Commonwealth Games medallists in swimming (men)

References

1966 births
Living people
Sportspeople from Kingston upon Hull
English male freestyle swimmers
Olympic swimmers of Great Britain
Swimmers at the 1986 Commonwealth Games
Swimmers at the 1988 Summer Olympics
Swimmers at the 1990 Commonwealth Games
Commonwealth Games silver medallists for England
Commonwealth Games bronze medallists for England
Commonwealth Games medallists in swimming
Universiade medalists in swimming
Universiade bronze medalists for Great Britain
Medalists at the 1987 Summer Universiade
Medallists at the 1986 Commonwealth Games